Cypress Point Creamery is a cheese producer in Hawthorne, Florida. It is owned by John and Nancy Mims who maintain a herd of 170 Jersey cows as well as some Brown Swiss cows. The creamery is the state of Florida's fourth cheesemaking business that produces its cheeses on the same farm that produces the milk used in their creation, according to Scott Wallin of Florida Dairy Farmers.

References

External links
Cypress Point Creamery website

Dairy products companies of the United States
Farms in Florida